Håvard Lund (born 20 October 1970 in Gildeskål, Norway), is a Norwegian jazz musician (clarinet and saxophone) and composer, known from a series of recordings and collaborations with musicians like Anja Garbarek, Vigleik Storaas, Steinar Raknes, Håkon Mjåset Johansen, Farmers Market, Frode Fjellheims Jazzjoik Ensemble, later to become Transjoik, Trygve Seim Ensemble and Trondheim Jazz Orchestra.

Career

During 1996–2002 he composed music for a number of dramatic productions, including for Torshovteateret, Trøndelag Teater, NRK Radioteateret and Det Norske Teatret. From 2003 to 2008 he played for Forsvarets Musikkorps Nord-Norge as clarinetist, and was this year's festival artist Festspillene in Northern Norway in 2006. In addition he was Artist in residence at Musikk i Troms from 2007 to 2008, after which he held a permanent position there as a regional musician.

Lund has also worked as a session musician on numerous recordings, including with Decoy, Fotefar, Trygve Seim, Frode Fjellheim and Anja Garbarek.

In the 2010s, Lund developed The Arctic Hideaway, a residential workspace and part-year hotel on Sørvær in the  group of islands in the Arctic Ocean, 40 minutes from Bodø.

Discography
1996: Letters, with fellow students in Trondheim
2010: My Sister Said, jazz chamber music with Vigleik Storaas, Steinar Raknes and Håkon Mjåset Johansen.
2012: Blix by Lund, world music with among others Unni Løvlid, Sunanda Sharma, Svante Henrysson and the  ensemble MiNensemblet

References

External links

Anmeldelse av My Sister Said
Anmeldelse av "Blix by Lund"

Norwegian jazz saxophonists
Norwegian jazz clarinetists
Norwegian jazz composers
Male jazz composers
People from Gildeskål
Living people
Norwegian University of Science and Technology alumni
1970 births
21st-century saxophonists
21st-century clarinetists
21st-century Norwegian male musicians
Trondheim Jazz Orchestra members
Farmers Market (band) members